Sasna or Sassen was one of the regions of ancient Prussia. It is now located in northern Poland.

Etymology

Variations of the region's name include Sasna, Sassen, Sasno, Soysim, Sossen, Sassen, Szossen, and Czossin. Its name is traditionally derived from sasnis the Old Prussian word for hare.

History

It is first mentioned as terra Soysim in a 1267 document written by King Ottokar II of Bohemia. It was a small and scarcely inhabited territory roughly between Galindia and Lubavia. Before the arrival of the Teutonic Knights, it was plundered by Masovians and its inhabitants moved northward. It was first governed from Dzierzgoń before its own administrative center was set up at Ostróda.

Sasna was included within the Duchy of Prussia in 1525 and later composed the Kreise Osterode and Neidenburg of East Prussia. In 1945, following World War II, the region became part of Poland.

Notes

References
 
 

East Prussia
Geography of Prussia
Historical regions in Poland